Ranchhodbhai Chanabhai Faldu (born 1 August 1957) is a Member of Legislative assembly from Kalavad constituency in Gujarat for its 12th legislative assembly and Jamnagar South in 14th assembly. He is a cabinet minister of Agricultural, Fisheries, Animal Husbandry, and Transport field of Gujarat in 2017.

Early life and education 
Faldu was born on 1 August 1957 to a family of farmer in Kalavad, Jamnagar district, Bombay State (present-day Gujarat). He was the youngest of 9 children born to Chanabhai Virabhai Faldu and Rambhaben Chanabhai Faldu. Faldu's family belonged to the Leuva Patel community.

References

Living people
People from Gujarat
Gujarat MLAs 2007–2012
Bharatiya Janata Party politicians from Gujarat
Gujarat MLAs 2017–2022
State cabinet ministers of Gujarat
1957 births
People from Jamnagar district
Gujarat MLAs 1998–2002
Gujarat MLAs 2002–2007